Tucson Speedway is a  paved oval racetrack located at the Pima County Fairgrounds, off Interstate 10 just south of Tucson, Arizona.  It is one of only three paved ovals in the state of Arizona (the others are Phoenix Raceway and Havasu 95 Speedway).

History
The track was built in 1968, originally as a clay oval and called Raven Speedway. Former NASCAR CEO Brian France took over track operations in 1990.  The International Speedway Corporation (ISC) paved the racing surface and renamed the track in 1992. ISC sold the track to Deery Sports West, Inc. ten years later.

In 2005 the track was sold to Dan and Joyce Ruth, who made many track improvements. Three years later, Ruth sold the track to Mark Ebert, who made it an ASA Member track. The track was closed in 2010. In 2012, Tucson businessman John Lashley bought the lease on the track and spent six months renovating the facility, which re-opened in 2013 as Tucson Speedway. In 2014 Tucson Speedway joined NASCAR as an authorized Hometrack.

Racing at TRP
In 2014, Tucson Speedway re-joined the NASCAR Whelen All-American Series. Tucson Speedway features Super Late Models, Limited Late Models, Pro-Stocks, Modifieds, Hornets, Bandoleros, and Thunder Trucks. The NASCAR K&N Pro Series West schedule holds the Twin 100s events in May.

Races are usually held every other Saturday night, with occasional practice sessions held on Friday's the day before.  Thanks to the warm climate in Tucson, the track is able to remain open from February to November, only closing on weekends when there is a NCS race at Phoenix Raceway.

Former events
In 1995, TRP hosted the second-ever NASCAR Truck Series race, the Racing Champions 200.  This race returned in 1996 and 1997 as the NAPA 200.

TRP was also the home of the TV program Winter Heat Series, which ran during NASCAR's offseason from 1994–95 and 1998–99.  This program was the launching pad for the careers of drivers such as Greg Biffle, Kurt Busch, Matt Crafton and others.

References

External links
 Tucson Speedway Official Website

Buildings and structures in Pima County, Arizona
Motorsport venues in Arizona
Sports venues in Tucson, Arizona
NASCAR tracks
Tourist attractions in Pima County, Arizona
1968 establishments in Arizona
Sports venues completed in 1968